Charlotte Louise Russell (born 4 February 1988) is a former international cricketer who made three appearances for the England women's cricket team. She played as an off-spin bowler who gave the ball air and a right-handed lower order batter.

Early life

Russell was born on 4 February 1988 in Brighton, East Sussex.

Domestic career

At county level Russell played for Sussex between 2006 and 2011, helping them to the County Championship title in 2008 and 2010. She also played for Diamonds in the Super Fours competition and for Brighton and Hove in club cricket.

Russell spent part of the 2007/08 winter in New Zealand playing for Northern Districts.

International career

Russell made her England debut in a Twenty20 International against New Zealand at the County Ground, Taunton on 16 August 2007. She made her One Day International debut the following day, also against New Zealand at Taunton. Her only subsequent international match was a One Day International against New Zealand at Stanley Park, Blackpool on 27 August 2007. She took one wicket across her three international appearances.

References

External links 

1988 births
Living people
England women One Day International cricketers
England women Twenty20 International cricketers
Sussex women cricketers
Northern Districts women cricketers